Gonzalo Hernandez y Hermosillo y Gonzalez, O.S.A. (1560 – 28 January, 1631) was a Roman Catholic prelate who served as the first Bishop of Durango (1620–1631).

Biography
Gonzalo Hernandez y Hermosillo y Gonzalez was born in México in 1560 and ordained a priest in the Order of Saint Augustine.
On 12 October 1620, he was appointed during the papacy of Pope Paul V as Bishop of Durango. On 30 November 1621, he was consecrated bishop by Juan Pérez de la Serna, Archbishop of México. He served as Bishop of Durango until his death on 28 January 1631.

References

External links and additional sources
 (for Chronology of Bishops) 
 (for Chronology of Bishops) 

17th-century Roman Catholic bishops in Mexico
Bishops appointed by Pope Paul V
1560 births
1631 deaths
Augustinian bishops